Nika Šapek (born 26 April 2000) is a Slovenian footballer who plays as a goalkeeper for Women's League club ŽNK Olimpija Ljubljana and the Slovenia women's national team.

Club career
Šapek has played for KNK Fužinar, ŽNK Radomlje and Olimpija Ljubljana in Slovenia.

International career
Šapek made her senior debut for Slovenia on 6 March 2018 in a 2–2 friendly home draw against Serbia.

References

External links

2000 births
Living people
Slovenian women's footballers
Women's association football goalkeepers
ŽNK Radomlje players
ŽNK Olimpija Ljubljana players
Slovenia women's international footballers